Thunder Queens F.C. is a Ghanaian professional women's football club based in Accra in the Greater Accra Region of Ghana. The club is in the Ghana Women’s Premier League.

History 
Thunder Queens was established in 2010 by Sammy Adamaley and Anas Seidu Thunder as Samaria Ladies Academy. Adameley, who was the co-owner of the club, mutually terminated his contract and left the club, after which Siedu became the sole owner and CEO. In August 2020, the club was rebranded and the name changed to Thunder Queens.

In the 2015–16 season, the club gained promotion to the Southern zone of the Ghana Women's Premier League (GWPL) for the first time. In 2021, the club reached the semi-finals of the 2021 Ghana Women's FA Cup.

Ground 
The club plays its home matches at the Tema Community 8 park.

Notable players 
For details on notable Thunder Queens F.C. footballers see Category:Thunder Queens F.C. players.

Philicity Asuako, Gladys Amfobea and Gifty Acheampong.

References

External links 
 Thunder Queens FC on Facebook

Football clubs in Accra
Women's football clubs in Ghana
2010 establishments in Ghana
Association football clubs established in 2010